The 1907 Dorris Motor Car Company Building is a factory and industrial warehouse located at what is now 4059 – 4065 Forest Park Avenue in the Central West End neighborhood of St. Louis, Missouri. The building was originally constructed in 1907 as an automobile factory for the Dorris Motor Car Company and was modified in 1909 with the addition of a third story. It was the headquarters and manufacturing facility for the company until 1926, and the company played a significant role in the establishment of St. Louis as an automotive assembly and parts manufacturing center. It was listed on the National Register of Historic Places on February 10, 2000.

In 1926, the Dorris Motor Car Company officially went out of business, but the building has seen subsequent use. It held the Brauer Brothers Manufacturing Company's shoe factory for many years. After the Brauer Brothers Manufacturing Company moved out, the space was used for retail purposes by a furniture store. It then sat vacant for years. In 2004, it was renovated for use by the Center for Emerging Technologies, a startup incubator that is now called the CIC@CET. The building is undergoing further renovation today for continued use by the CIC@CET.

References

External links 
 From Dorris Motor Co. to Biotech Startups, A Building's History of Entrepreneurship
 Design work underway at Cortex project

Buildings and structures in St. Louis
Commercial buildings completed in 1907
Motor vehicle assembly plants in Missouri
Commercial buildings on the National Register of Historic Places in Missouri
National Register of Historic Places in St. Louis
Motor vehicle manufacturing plants on the National Register of Historic Places
Transportation buildings and structures on the National Register of Historic Places in Missouri